South Bethlehem Downtown Historic District is a national historic district in Bethlehem in Northampton County, Pennsylvania. The district includes 288 contributing buildings and two contributing objects. It encompasses a concentration of late-19th through early 20th century commercial, municipal, industrial and residential buildings. Most of them date from about 1900 to 1935. 

Notable non-residential buildings include several Bethlehem Steel-related buildings, the South Bethlehem Post Office (1916), Bethlehem Public Library (1929), Protection Firehouse (Touchstone Theater, 1875), E.P. Wilbur Trust Building (1910), Holy Infancy Catholic Church (1892), St. John Windish Lutheran Church (1910), Windish Hall (c. 1915), and the Banana Factory (c. 1900).

The district was added to the National Register of Historic Places in 2005.

References

Bethlehem, Pennsylvania
Historic districts in Northampton County, Pennsylvania
Historic districts on the National Register of Historic Places in Pennsylvania
National Register of Historic Places in Northampton County, Pennsylvania